Piro Qirjo (born 16 October 1963) is an Albanian actor and director. Most notably, he played Gjorg Berisha in Të paftuarit of Ismail Kadare's adaptation of Broken April and the German Wehrmacht major Max in Kronikë e një nate. His directing career is known for documentary films and various advertisement films.

Biography
Piro Qirjo was born in Korçë, Albania on 16 October 1963. During the high school years he worked as a puppeteer in the Andon Zako Çajupi Theatre. After the high school he went to Tirana to study acting at the High Institute of Arts and graduated in 1987. Piro played in a number of movies until the early '90s. Since 2000 he has directed documentary films about scientific and social issues and worked as a creative director for various advertisement films.

Filmography

Theatre credits

Director
Piro Qirjo's directing career spans documentary and advertising films. He has directed scientific and institutional documentaries in cooperation with Albanian and international public institutions. He is also the creative director of various advertisement media and short films.

References

Notes

Bibliography
 Kinostudio “Shqipëria e Re” (1990) Filmi shqiptar 1977-1987, 8 Nëntori, Tirana
 Hoxha, Abaz (2002) “100 vjet kinema në trojet shqiptare (100 years of Cinema in Albanian Dwellings)”, Marin Barleti, Tirana 
 Hoxha, Abaz (2002) Enciklopedi e Kinematografisë Shqiptare, TOENA publishing house, Tirana 

Albanian male film actors
Albanian film directors
People from Korçë
1963 births
Living people
University of Arts (Albania) alumni